William Mahoney (January 13, 1869 in Chicago, Illinois – August 17, 1952 in Saint Paul, Minnesota) was mayor of Saint Paul, Minnesota from 1932 to 1934. He was founder and editor of Minnesota Union Advocate from 1920 until 1932, when he was elected mayor. Mahoney was a main figure in the formation of the Farmer-Labor Party and ran for the United States House of Representatives under that party name. He was an American of Irish descent.

He is interred at Sunset Memorial Park Cemetery, St. Anthony, Minnesota.

References

American people of Irish descent
Mayors of Saint Paul, Minnesota
1869 births
1952 deaths
Minnesota Farmer–Laborites